Edward F. Harrington (1878-1951) was an American politician who served as a member of the Massachusetts House of Representatives and was city manager of Fall River, Massachusetts.

Early life
Harrington was born on August 10, 1878, in Fall River, Massachusetts. He attended parochial school and afterwards engaged in the business of real estate.

Political career
In 1902, Harrington served on the Fall River city council. From 1903 to 1908, he was a member of the city's board of aldermen. From 1909 to 1924 he represented the 10th Bristol District in the Massachusetts House of Representatives. In 1921 he was elected Democratic house floor leader. From 1924 to 1928 he was the City Clerk of Fall River. In January 1929 he became Fall River's first ever city manager. In 1930 he announced that he would not be a candidate for reappointment and was succeeded by former Watertown, New York, manager J. Walter Ackerman.

Death
Harrington died on January 16, 1951, in Fall River. He was survived by his wife, a son, and three daughters. His sister, Alice C. Harrington, was a teacher at Somerset High School and B.M.C. Durfee High School, and an administrator in the Fall River school system. His son, John J. Harrington, taught at B.M.C Durfee High School in Fall River for over forty years. His grandson Edward F. Harrington served as United States Attorney for the District of Massachusetts and as a Judge for the United States District Court for the District of Massachusetts. Another grandson, John T. Harrington, MD, was the Dean of Tufts University School of Medicine from 1995 - 2002. His third grandson, Daniel T. Harrington, MD, was a sole practitioner in gastroenterology in Fall River.

See also
 1915 Massachusetts legislature
 1916 Massachusetts legislature
 1917 Massachusetts legislature
 1918 Massachusetts legislature
 1919 Massachusetts legislature
 1920 Massachusetts legislature
 1921–1922 Massachusetts legislature
 1923–1924 Massachusetts legislature

References

1878 births
1951 deaths
Massachusetts city managers
Democratic Party members of the Massachusetts House of Representatives
Politicians from Fall River, Massachusetts